Liquid Tension Experiment is the self-titled first studio album by the band Liquid Tension Experiment, released on March 10, 1998, through Magna Carta Records. The band featured guitarist John Petrucci and drummer Mike Portnoy, at the time both of Dream Theater; bassist Tony Levin; and keyboardist Jordan Rudess, who would go on to join Dream Theater in 1999.

Background
"Chris and Kevin's Excellent Adventure" is a reference to the album's photo sessions, where the photographer misnamed Portnoy and Levin as "Chris" and "Kevin". "Three Minute Warning", a single song which is split into five tracks, references an incident in the studio where Levin became frustrated with the band's insistence on composing songs instead of improvising jams. The album's back cover includes a humorous disclaimer on tracks 9 to 13:Caution: "Three Minute Warning" is not for the musically faint-hearted, impatient, or critics of extreme self-indulgence. If you fall into any of the above categories, please hit the stop button on your CD player after track #8.

Track listing

Personnel

John Petrucci – guitar, production
Tony Levin – Chapman Stick, bass guitar, electric upright bass, production
Jordan Rudess – keyboard, production
Mike Portnoy – drums, production
Paul Orofino – engineering
Kosaku Nakamura – engineering assistance
Kevin Shirley – mixing
Rich Alvy – mixing assistance
Leon Zervos – mastering

References

External links
Liquid Tension Experiment "Liquid Tension Experiment" at Guitar Nine Records
"Liquid Tension Experiment" by Liquid Tension Experiment at MusicBrainz

Liquid Tension Experiment albums
1998 debut albums
Magna Carta Records albums